Careers  is a 1929 American all-talking pre-Code drama film directed by John Francis Dillon and produced and released by First National Pictures. It stars Billie Dove and features Antonio Moreno, Thelma Todd and Noah Beery. The film was based on a 1924 German play entitled Karriere, written by Alfred Schirokauer and Paul Rosenhayn.

Careers was Billie's Dove first film with dialogue.

Plot
In the French colony of Cochin-China, young French magistrate Victor Gromaire (Antonio Moreno) and his wife Hélène (Billie Dove) are virtually prisoners because the colony's president (Noah Beery) is attracted to the wife. The president blocks Victor's career on the bench until his wife agrees to his demands. Victor, angered by this treatment after four years of hard work, secretly goes to the governor of the colony to complain.

Advised by Carouge (Holmes Herbert), a prominent attorney in the colony, as to why her husband's career has been stymied, Hélène tries to save her husband from disaster by pleading with the president, but inadvertently reveals her husband's plan. Afraid for his safety, she consents to do whatever the president wishes, as long as he does nothing to endanger her husband. Just as he is about to take advantage of her offer, he is murdered by a native musician (Kamiyama Sojin) who has been hiding in the room.

Hélène is immediately suspected of the murder, and the musician comes out of hiding and accuses her of the crime. Victor is placed in charge of the investigation and discovers that the musician is lying, and that he is the murderer.

Tired of the dangers of life in the French colony, the couple head back to Paris, where Victor hopes to start a new career.

Cast
 Billie Dove as Hélène Gromaire
 Antonio Moreno as Victor Gromaire
 Thelma Todd as Hortense
 Noah Beery as The President
 Holmes Herbert as Carouge
 Carmel Myers as the woman
 Robert Frazer as Lavergne Solin
 Kamiyama Sojin as Biwa Player

Cast note:
Carmel Myers sings the song "I Love You, I Hate You"

Preservation
The film was considered a lost film, with only the Vitaphone soundtrack still in existence. However, a print was discovered an Italian film archive in 2017.

References

External links

Careers at silentera.com

1929 films
American black-and-white films
Films directed by John Francis Dillon
First National Pictures films
Warner Bros. films
1920s rediscovered films
American drama films
1929 drama films
Rediscovered American films
1920s English-language films
1920s American films